Lielplatone parish is an administrative unit of  Jelgava Municipality in the Semigallia region of Latvia (prior to the 2009 administrative reforms the Jelgava District).

Towns, villages and settlements of Lielplatone parish 

The largest settlements are Lielplatone (parish center), Sidrabe (Mazplatone), Tīsi, Braņķi.

See also 
Lielplatone manor

References 

Parishes of Latvia
Jelgava Municipality
Semigallia